A griefer or bad-faith player is a player in a multiplayer video game who deliberately and intentionally irritates and harasses other players within the game (trolling), by using aspects of the game in unintended ways in order to destroy something another player made or built, or stealing something, such as items or loot, when that is not the primary objective. A griefer derives pleasure primarily, or exclusively, from the act of annoying other users, and as such, is a particular nuisance in online gaming communities. If a bad-faith player is attempting to gain a strategic advantage, it could be considered cheating.

History
The term "griefing" was applied to online multiplayer video games by the year 2000 or earlier, as illustrated by postings to the rec.games.computer.ultima.online USENET group. The player is said to cause "grief" in the sense of "giving someone grief".

The term "griefing" dates to the late 1990s, when it was used to describe the willfully antisocial behaviors seen in early massively multiplayer online games like Ultima Online, and first-person shooters such as Counter-Strike. Even before it had a name, griefer-like behavior was familiar in the virtual worlds of text-based Multi-User Domains (MUDs), where joyriding invaders inflicted "virtual rape" and similar offenses on the local populace. Julian Dibbell's 1993 article "A Rape in Cyberspace" analyzed the griefing events in a particular MUD, LambdaMOO, and the staff's response.

In the culture of massively multiplayer online role-playing games (MMORPGs) in Taiwan, such as Lineage, griefers are known as "white-eyed"—a metaphor meaning that their eyes have no pupils and so they look without seeing.  Behaviors other than griefing that can cause players to be stigmatized as "white-eyed" include cursing, cheating, stealing, or unreasonable killing.

Methods

Methods of griefing differ from game to game. What might be considered griefing in one area of a game, may even be an intended function or mechanic in another area. Common methods may include but are not limited to:

Intentional friendly fire, or deliberately performing actions detrimental to other team members' game performance in primarily shooter games.
Wasting or destroying key game elements
Colluding with opponents
Giving false information
Giving information about your team's whereabouts to an enemy team
Faking extreme incompetence with the intent of hurting teammates, or failing an in-game objective
Deliberately blocking shots from a player's own team, or blocking a player's view by standing in front of them, so they cannot damage the enemy
Trapping teammates in inescapable locations by using physics props, special abilities, or teleportation
Actions undertaken to waste other players' time.
Playing as slowly as possible
Hiding from an enemy when there is no tactical benefit in doing so
If a game interface element has no time limit, leaving their computer (going "AFK"), potentially forcing the other players to leave the game (which may incur a penalty for leaving), like Among Us.
Constantly pausing the game, or lowering its speed as much as possible, in the hopes that their target quits in frustration
Causing a player disproportionate loss or reversing their progress.
Destroying or vandalizing other players' creations without permission in sandbox games like Minecraft and Terraria
Driving vehicles backward around lapped courses in multiplayer racing games, often done with the intent of crashing head-on into whoever is in first place
Using exploits (taking advantage of bugs in a game).
Illegally exiting a map's boundaries to prevent the enemy team from winning
In a co-op or multiplayer game, destroying or otherwise denying access to items, which without, other players cannot finish the game
Purposeful violation of server rules or guidelines.
Impersonation of administrators or other players through similar screen names
Written or verbal insults, including false accusations of cheating or griefing
Spamming a voice or text chat channel to inconvenience, harass, or annoy other players.
Uploading offensive or explicit images to profile pictures, in-game sprays, or game skins.
Kill stealing, denying another player the satisfaction or gain of killing a target that should have been theirs.
Camping at a corpse or spawn area to repeatedly kill players as they respawn (when players have no method of recourse to prevent getting killed), preventing them from being able to play. Camping can also refer to continuously waiting in a tactically advantageous position for others to come to them; this is sometimes considered griefing because if all players do it, the game stalls, but this is now more commonly considered a game design issue.
Acting out-of-character in a role-play setting to disrupt the serious gameplay of others.
Luring many monsters or a single larger monster to chase the griefer, before moving to where other players are. The line of monsters in pursuit looks like a train, and hence this is sometimes called "training" or "aggroing".
Blocking other players so they cannot move to or from a particular area, or access an in-game resource (such as a non-player character); the game Tom Clancy's The Division was found to have a serious problem with this at launch, where griefers could stand in the doorway out of the starting area, trapping players in the spawn room.
Intentionally attempting to crash a server through lag or other means (such as spawning large amounts of resource-demanding objects), in order to cause interference among players.
Smurfing, the process of creating extra accounts and deliberately losing games to enter a lower skill rank than is appropriate, before playing at full skill against lower-ranked opponents, thus defeating them easily.
High-skill players deliberately losing in matches against low-skill players (usually due to shortage of players), causing the low-skill player's skill rating to artificially rise so that they will be routinely pitted against opponents they have no chance of winning against in the future.
Impersonating an enemy to trick someone into attacking the griefer, so that a player is flagged as having attacked the griefer. A notable example of this is early on in Ultima Online, where players had a scroll that could change their appearance to that of a monster, with the only way to tell the difference between them and a real monster is to click on them and read their name. Attacking a monster disguised griefer would flag the player as a murderer, causing the town guard to kill the player.

The term is sometimes applied more generally to refer to a person who uses the internet to cause distress to others as a prank, or to intentionally inflict harm, as when it was used to describe an incident in March 2008, when malicious users posted seizure-inducing animations on epilepsy forums.

Industry response
Many subscription-based games actively oppose griefers, since their behavior can drive away business. It is common for developers to release server-side upgrades and patches to annul griefing methods. Many online games employ gamemasters that reprimand offenders. Some use a crowdsourcing approach, where players can report griefing. Malicious players are then red-flagged, and are then dealt with at a gamemaster's discretion. As many as 25% of customer support calls to companies operating online games deal specifically with griefing.

Blizzard Entertainment has enacted software components to combat griefing. To prevent non-consensual attacks between players, some games such as Ultima Online have created separate realms for those who wish to be able to attack anyone at any time, and for those who do not. Others implemented separate servers.

When EverQuest was released, Sony included a PvP switch where people could fight each other only if they had enabled that option. This was done in order to prevent the player-killing that was driving people away from Ultima Online, which at that time had no protection on any of its servers.

Second Life bans players for harassment (defined as being rude or threatening, making unwelcome sexual advances, or performing activities likely to annoy or alarm somebody) and assault (shooting, pushing, or shoving in a safe area, or creating scripted objects that target another user and hinder their enjoyment of the game) in its community standards. Sanctions include warnings, suspension from Second Life, or being banned altogether.

Some space simulators, like Eve Online, have incorporated activities typically considered griefing as part of the gameplay mechanism. Corporate spying, theft, scams, gate-camping, and PvP on non-PvP players are all part of their gaming experience.

Shooters such as Counter Strike: Global Offensive have implemented peer review systems, where if a player is reported too many times, multiple higher ranked players are allowed to review the player and determine if the reports are valid, and apply a temporary ban to the player's account if necessary. The player's name is omitted during the replay, as well as those of the other 9 players in the game. In October 2016, Valve implemented a change that will permanently ban a player if they receive two penalties for griefing.

Many Minecraft servers have rules against griefing. In Minecraft freebuild servers, griefing is often the destruction of another player's build, and in other servers the definition ranges, but almost all servers recognize harassment as griefing. Most servers use temporary bans for minor and/or first-time incidents, and indefinite bans from the server for more serious and/or repeat offences. While many servers try to fight this, some allow griefing as part of the gameplay.

In recent years, Grand Theft Auto Online has experienced a drastic increase in griefing, due in part to the emergence of bugs and better money-making opportunities. Common griefing techniques within the game abuse passive mode and trivially accessible weaponized vehicles. Developer Rockstar has implemented measures such as a longer cool-down on passive mode, patching invincibility glitches, and removing passive mode from weaponized vehicles in recent updates. In addition, the game also features a reputation system that, in effect, after excessive "bad sport point" accumulation, will mark players as "bad sports", allowing them to only play in lobbies with other "bad sports". Such points are either accumulated over time or gained within a certain time frame and are acquired by actions such as destroying another player's personal vehicle, or quitting jobs early. This is one of the more controversial features of the game, as some point out flaws such as the game not considering if destruction of a vehicle was self-defense.

Fallout 76 discourages players from griefing by marking them as wanted criminals, which one can get a reward for killing.  Wanted players cannot see any other players on the world map, and must rely on their normal player view.

Popular culture
In the South Park episode "Make Love, Not Warcraft", the children attempt to vanquish a griefer in World of Warcraft.

See also

 Dark triad
 Anti-social behaviour
 Cyberbullying
 Wikipedia:Griefing
 Lulz
 Schadenfreude
 Internet troll
 Spamming
 Online harassment
 Video game exploit
 Leeroy Jenkins
 Glossary of video game terms
 Aimbot
 2b2t

References

External links

 Globe and Mail: "Frontier justice: Can virtual worlds be civilized?"
 "Ready, set, game: Learn how to keep video gaming safe and fun."
 Documented incident of griefing during a virtual interview, see also Anshe Chung
 Research paper on griefing. To view this PDF paper, the host website requires a subscription to the digital library.
 "Feature: The Griefer Within", GamePro.
 "Mutilated Furries, Flying Phalluses: Put the Blame on Griefers", WIRED MAGAZINE: ISSUE 16.02
 "Griefer Madness: Terrorizing Virtual Worlds"
 Can you grief it? - feature article at VideoGamer.com

Esports terminology
Internet trolling
MUD terminology
Video game culture
Video game gameplay
Video game terminology